Kris Sweet is a professional gridiron football coach who is the offensive line coach for the Toronto Argonauts of the Canadian Football League (CFL).

College career
Sweet played college football as a center for the Carson–Newman Eagles and earned his bachelor's degree in physical education in 1996 and his master's degree in education in 1998.

Coaching career

College football
Sweet began his coaching career as an offensive graduate assistant for the Tennessee Tech Golden Eagles in 1997. Following stints with the Holy Cross Crusaders in 1998 and the Elon Phoenix in 1999, he joined the Presbyterian Blue Hose in 2000 as the team's tight ends coach and fullbacks coach. In 2001, he became the offensive line coach for the Blue Hose and then was named offensive coordinator in 2003. He added the titles of recruiting coordinator and academic coordinator in 2003. In 2005, Sweet joined the Kentucky State Thorobreds staff as the team's offensive line coach and then moved to the Columbia Lions in 2006 in the same capacity.

Calgary Stampeders
On February 16, 2007, it was announced that Sweet had joined the Calgary Stampeders to serve as team's offensive line coach, which marked his first foray into professional football. He was retained in 2008 by new head coach John Hufnagel and Sweet won his first Grey Cup championship following the Stampeders' victory in the 96th Grey Cup game.

Saskatchewan Roughriders
On January 3, 2012, Sweet was named the run game coordinator and offensive line coach for the Saskatchewan Roughriders. However, he was with the team for only one season as he was dismissed at the end of the year.

Edmonton Eskimos
On February 11, 2013, the Edmonton Eskimos announced that Sweet had joined their coaching staff to serve as the team's offensive line coach. After head coach Kavis Reed was fired following the 2013 season, Sweet was not retained by incoming head coach Chris Jones.

Montreal Alouettes
On March 6, 2014, it was announced that Sweet had joined the Montreal Alouettes as the team's offensive line coach, reuniting him with head coach Tom Higgins who had first hired him into the CFL in 2007. He was with the team for three years under three different head coaches.

College football (II)
Sweet returned to the American college ranks in 2018 when he was named the offensive line coach for the Norfolk State Spartans. In 2019, he joined the Lyon Scots as the team's offensive coordinator, but his tenure was cut short after he was diagnosed with Non-Hodgkin lymphoma. After recovering, he joined the Howard Bison in 2021 to serve as their offensive line coach.

Toronto Argonauts
It was announced on January 19, 2022, that Sweet had joined the Toronto Argonauts as their offensive line coach. In his first year, the Argonauts won the 109th Grey Cup and Sweet won his second championship.

Personal life
Sweet and his wife, Kate, have two children, Alexandra and Megan.

References

External links
Toronto Argonauts profile

Date of birth missing (living people)
Living people
American football offensive linemen
Calgary Stampeders coaches
Edmonton Elks coaches
Montreal Alouettes coaches
Players of American football from Virginia
Toronto Argonauts coaches
Saskatchewan Roughriders coaches
Year of birth missing (living people)